Mildred Dorothy Dunnock (January 25, 1901 – July 5, 1991) was an American stage and screen actress. She was twice nominated for an Academy Award: first Death of a Salesman in 1951, then Baby Doll in 1956.

Early life
Born in Baltimore, Maryland, Dunnock graduated from Western High School. She developed an interest in theater while she was a student at Goucher College where she was a member of Alpha Phi sorority and the Agora dramatic society. After graduating, she taught English at Friends School of Baltimore and helped with productions of plays there. 

While teaching school in New York, she earned her master's degree at Columbia University and acted in a play while she was there.

Career
After roles in Broadway productions of Life Begins (1932) and The Hill Between (1938), Dunnock won praise for her performance as a Welsh school teacher in The Corn is Green in 1940 — a role that she performed while she was a full-time teacher at Brearley School. The 1945 film version marked her screen debut. During the 1940s she performed mainly  on stage, in such dramas as Another Part of the Forest (1946) and Death of a Salesman (1949) and in the musical Lute Song (1946). She also performed in regional theatrical productions, including those of the Long Wharf Theatre and the Yale Repertory Theatre.

In 1947, she became a founding member of the Actors Studio.

Dunnock reprised her role as Linda Loman, Willy's wife, in the 1951 film version of Death of a Salesman. She originated the role of Big Mama on Broadway in Tennessee Williams' play Cat on a Hot Tin Roof, although she lost the film role to Judith Anderson. Several of her films include The Trouble with Harry (1955), Love Me Tender (1956), Baby Doll (1956), Peyton Place (1957), The Nun's Story (1959), Butterfield 8 (1960), Something Wild (1961) and Sweet Bird of Youth (1962). She was the woman in the wheelchair pushed down a flight of stairs to her death by the psychotic villain Tommy Udo (Richard Widmark) in Kiss of Death (1947). She also appeared in guest roles on numerous TV series such as Alfred Hitchcock Presents and Ponds Theater, and, later in her career, several television movies.

Dunnock was twice nominated for an Academy Award for Best Supporting Actress, for Death of a Salesman in 1951, and for Baby Doll in 1956. She was also nominated for the Golden Globe for Best Supporting Actress for Baby Doll, as well as Viva Zapata! in 1952 and Peyton Place in 1957.

In 1966, she played Linda Loman for the third time in the television film adaptation of Death of a Salesman, alongside her original Broadway co-star, Lee J. Cobb. This earned Dunnock a nomination for an Emmy Award in 1967, in the category of Outstanding Single Performance by an Actress in a Leading Role in a Drama.

Her final film was The Pick-up Artist (1987), which starred Robert Downey, Jr. and Molly Ringwald.

Dunnock has a star on the Hollywood Walk of Fame for her contribution to motion pictures, at 6613 Hollywood Boulevard. She is also a member of the American Theater Hall of Fame, which she was inducted into in 1983.

Personal life and death
Dunnock was married to Keith Urmy, an executive at Chemical Bank in Manhattan, from 1933 until her death. The couple had one child. In 1991, at age 90, Dunnock died from natural causes in Oak Bluffs, Massachusetts, although at that time she was a resident of nearby West Tilsbury.

Film appearances

The Invisible Man's Revenge (1944) – Norma – the Chambermaid (uncredited)
The Corn Is Green (1945) – Miss Ronberry
Kiss of Death (1947) – Mrs. Rizzo (uncredited)
Death of a Salesman (1951) – Linda Loman
I Want You (1951) – Sarah Greer
Viva Zapata! (1952) – Senora Espejo
The Girl in White (1952) – Dr. Marie Yeomans
The Jazz Singer (1952) – Mrs. Ruth Golding
Bad for Each Other (1953) – Mrs. Mary Owen
Hansel and Gretel (1954) – Mother (voice)
The Trouble with Harry (1955) – Mrs. Wiggs
Love Me Tender (1956) – Martha Reno
Baby Doll (1956) – Aunt Rose Comfort
Peyton Place (1957) – Miss Elsie Thornton
The Nun's Story (1959) – Sister Margharita (Mistress of Postulants)
The Story on Page One (1959) – Mrs. Ellis
BUtterfield 8 (1960) – Mrs. Wandrous
Something Wild (1961) – Mrs. Gates
Sweet Bird of Youth (1962) – Aunt Nonnie
Behold a Pale Horse (1964) – Pilar
Youngblood Hawke (1964) – Sarah Hawke
7 Women (1966) – Jane Argent
Death of a Salesman (1966) – Linda Loman
What Ever Happened to Aunt Alice? (1969) – Miss Edna Tinsley
The Spiral Staircase (1975) – Mrs. Sherman
The Shopping Bag Lady (1975) – Annie Lewis
Dragonfly (1976) (later: One Summer Love) – Miss Barrow
The Best Place to Be (1979)
The Pick-up Artist (1987) – Nellie (final film role)

Television
Alfred Hitchcock Presents (1956–64) – S2 E5 "None Are So Blind", S2 E35 "The West Warlock Time Capsule", S3 E4 "Heart of Gold", & S9 E14 "Beyond the Sea of Death"
Thriller (American TV series) (1960) – S1 E15 "The Cheaters"
The Tom Ewell Show (1960) – episode "The Friendly Man"
The Investigators (1961) – episode 11 "The Mind's Own Fire"

Radio appearances

See also
The Shopping Bag Lady

References

External links

 
 
 
 

1901 births
1991 deaths
20th-century American actresses
Actresses from Baltimore
Actresses from Massachusetts
Actresses from New York City
American film actresses
American stage actresses
American television actresses
Burials in Massachusetts
Columbia University alumni
Donaldson Award winners
Goucher College alumni
Johns Hopkins University alumni
Method actors
Oak Bluffs, Massachusetts
People from West Tisbury, Massachusetts
Western (genre) film actresses